Muzalevka is a rural locality in Baninsky Selsoviet Rural Settlement, Fatezhsky District, Kursk Oblast, Russia. The population as of 2010 is 46.

Geography 
The village is located in the Rzhavets River basin (a tributary of the Krasavka River in the Svapa River basin), 107 km from the Russia–Ukraine border, 54 km north-west of Kursk, 9 km north-east of the district center – the town Fatezh, 6 km from the selsoviet center – Chermoshnoy.

Climate
Muzalevka has a warm-summer humid continental climate (Dfb in the Köppen climate classification).

Transport 
Muzalevka is located 2.5 km from the federal route  Crimea Highway as part of the European route E105, 5.5 km from the road of regional importance  (Verkhny Lyubazh – Ponyri), 1 km from the road of intermunicipal significance  (M2 "Crimea Highway" – Sotnikovo), 27.5 km from the nearest railway station Vozy (railway line Oryol – Kursk).

The rural locality is situated 55 km from Kursk Vostochny Airport, 177 km from Belgorod International Airport and 234 km from Voronezh Peter the Great Airport.

References

Notes

Sources

Rural localities in Fatezhsky District